The following is a list of characters from the manga series Akumetsu written by Yoshiaki Tabata, and illustrated by Yûki Yugo.

Main characters
 "Shou"
The protagonist of the series. He appears to be an easygoing, reckless and somehow comical high-school student known only for constantly arriving late for classes. However, he is in fact one of the results of an experiment from years before by a powerful crime syndicate lord; there are seemingly unlimited Shous throughout the series, each nearly the same as the last. The crime lord, dying of old age, tried to use medicine and advanced technology to revive himself as a youth, and thus create a cloning facility where he experimented with cloning humans and transferring memories and experience from a mind to another, so as to be reborn as an "ultimate being" However, his plans failed, as he died before his project could be brought into fruition, and thus the numerous Shou clones were scattered far and wide in Japan, until two of them encountered each other by chance, thus prompting all clones to reunite. It is implied from the later chapters that there are over three hundred Shous scattered across Japan.

Because of a flashback involving Katsuragi (Shou's former classmate who died due to cancer caused by tainted medicine), the clones vow to redeem Japan and destroy what they perceive as evil, in a similar way of a terror group. They first go back to their lives for a certain period of time, each of them focusing on a single area of expertise (be it stunt-driving, surgery, military training, and so on), before returning to reunite all their experiences into a 'perfect' Shou; a Shou with all the experience, memories and training of every previous clone. The original clones then commit suicide; the current Shou (who switches up several times throughout the series) is cloned from this first perfect Shou.

While their methods are indeed brutal and extremely shocking, one thing has to be noted: the Shou clones all follows something of a code of conduct named one man, one kill, meaning only the chosen target will be put to death, no matter how many clones would be sacrificed in the process (one such example was the assassination of Takeo Tsuruta, involving the deaths of eighty clones). Obstacles such as police or bodyguards are simply evaded or subdued without deadly force.

All the Shou clones are aided in their acts by a peculiar, demonic mask which not only conceals their identity, but also serves as technologically advanced equipment. When worn, it drills itself into the wearer's skull and links to the brain, so as to assimilate all memories of that Shou and pass it on the others when he dies, normally after a killing. Also, to further prevent the world from understanding who they really are, each mask injects a bomb into the head of a Shou on the brink of death, which makes the head explode so as to prevent recognition and leaves only a headless body behind.

Presenting themselves as terrorists while making heavy use of costumes and even a cartoonish mascot nicknamed "Aametsu-kun," the Akumetsu group (the Shou clones) aim at one thing only: to purge Japan of all whom they perceive as "evil-doers", that is, all those in a position of power who are corrupt and revel in such chaos as a mean to make easy money, or simply those who, while capable of making changes, refuse to do so and only complain. Their executions are always presented as some sort of a show, where usually the Akumetsu, dressed appropriately (from a race driver to a ghost to a businessman) interrogates, frames for their wrongdoings and in the end massacres its intended victims, often in much brutal fashion to which follows his even more grisly death.

Without sermons or pleads, the Akumetsu are also very specific in explaining their motives and objectives to society, and while labeled terrorists by the media and the people, they also gained support from the masses in their bloody quest of disposing of the "evil-doers". To most of them, Akumetsu became not only the name of the "masked men", but also a moniker for the killing of those to be blamed for the crisis.

Akumetsu dies at the end of the series, by the mass death of every living Akumetsu clone and the destruction of the clone factory. Most of the Shous die as Akumetsu without their names ever being mentioned, with very few exceptions. At the point where the story begins, all the clones have already 'unified' once and the 'original' ones were killed to be used for raw materials for future clones. It is implied that they go through this process several times throughout the story, so probably the same name has been used by different individuals.

The catalyst that starts off the events of Akumetsu, he is the first to use the clone plant and the memory transfer device to 'revive' after receiving a near fatal injury while trying to save Katsuragi from getting run over by a truck. He becomes determined to punish those responsible for his friend Katsuragi's illness and eventual death, and he convinces the other clones to join him in his crusade. He is captured and then brutally tortured to death by Kitagami. This name is a pun on "two," as he is the second Shou to be introduced after Hazama.

A clone discovered and brought to the Shou conclave by Niikura after the first unification. He neither plays a very big role in the Akumetsu organization nor in the grand scheme, but he plays a central role in the plot in that everything begins and ends with Hazama. He is the only Akumetsu to survive the final battle with the Yakuza, but he sacrifices his own body so that Shiina can continue to live on. This name is a pun on "one."

Raised in the plant by one of the researchers who originally developed the cloning program, he continues to take care of the clone plant even after the death of "Grandma Sachiko." He continues to work on the clone research and eventually perfects the technology. He dies along with the clone plant.

Working at the TV station, he is the one who directs all Akumetsu's hijacked broadcasts and the final Akumetsu Documentary. He is killed in the final battle against the soldiers hired by the Takemaru group.

Sushi chef, shot and killed by Niikura's teacher Kuronuma who was posing as Akumetsu.

???
A clone mistaken to be a distant relative of criminal king pin M Gouda, and is captured and placed in a mental ward run by the Takimaru group. He dies as a lab rat.

Shou Hayasaka
A reporter. By infiltrating the media, he does most of the investigative work for the group. He leads the decisive final battle against Takimaru and Kitagami. He is shot by Kaori and dies before he could see his friends for the last time.

School

A schoolgirl and Hazama's best friend, who apparently has a crush on him. Due to her family's debts she was sold as a prostitute and forced to entertain businessmen and politicians, though her very first night of terror was cut short when Shou, wearing his trademark Akumetsu mask, showed up and, much to her horror, mauled to death the man she was ordered to serve. She instantly recognized him by his way of speaking and hairstyle (a recognition which one of the party attendants, an official, notices), though he initially brushed her off. Left shocked and almost catatonic after witnessing the carnage, she was even more appalled to find Shou alive and well the next day at school, though again she is brushed off as a lunatic. The official from the previous night then questions her, and there Shou intervenes and makes a clear statement of his powers, the fact that he is immortal and he "can be in more places at once". Too shocked to say anything, she is later revealed Shou saved her father from becoming a criminal as a mean to solve his need of money, and when questioning her if the "evil-doers" should die, she agreed to him. After those events Shiina continued with her normal life, though still left speechless and terrified by the campaign of terror led by the Shou clones. Near the end of the manga, when both she and Shou are near death, Shou uses his last mask to clone her and makes sure she lives on. She's seen years later as a reporter interviewing the former prime minister, who has chosen to become a vagabond.

A juvenile delinquent member of the bike gang Blossom, and a classmate of Hazama, who was never convicted of a brutal murder of an elderly citizen during a mugging. Since there was no police investigation, Iwata was allowed to enroll in high school. However, during the time Akumetsu pressured the police to stop a planned ride-through by Blossom, Iwata is killed after crashing into an oncoming car.

A teacher at Niikura's school, who is inspired by Akumetsu, and attempts to kill Congressman Tsuruta. However, his botched attempts endanger and kills innocent bystanders, which does not fit in with Akumetsu's 'one-man-one-kill' policy, which causes Shou to angrily refer to him as 'Seimetsu' (Killer of the Just). He is confronted by Shou and is later used as a human weapon to murder Tsurata. Dubbed as Akumetsu #2, Kuronuma is shot by the police, while the wheelchair he was on impaled the corrupt congressman before his mask detonated, killing him. As a teacher he was strict yet ridiculed, and believed in a society still capable of changing itself.

A member of Niikura's class who was being bullied into giving away her money. Kuronuma saw this once and tried to help her. She said it was okay but Kuronuma, who had already been worn down from stress, berated her for being made out as a fool while they came off clean. After being encouraged by how much he seemed to care, she went to talk to him while he was making his rounds. When she found him talking to Shou, she overheard that he was Akumetsu. The next day she saw Shou acting like an idiot as he always does questioned how such a person could be connected to a terrorist organization. In the most recent chapters, Shou appears to her and off-handedly tells her that all Akumetsu are clones. He goes on to explain that even though the DNA of the corpses matches his, Shou can't be arrested as the owners of the sample are dead and having identical DNA isn't technically a crime.

Shou Niikura's friend who inspired him and the other Shous in turn to become Akumetsu. Diagnosed with congenital afibrinogenemia at birth, he nevertheless becomes a successful stock broker and web novelist under the name of Kei Katsura by the age of 15. Katsuragi later develops liver cancer due to tainted fibrinogen and tries to commit suicide by jumping in front of a truck, but Shou pushes him out of the way and is hit instead. He in turn tries to develop a way to clone Katsuragi to repair his organs, but fails. The two of them grow closer up until Katsuragi passes away, but not before telling Niikura to fix Japan's ills, comparing him to the übermensch and writing him into the last chapter of his webnovel.

Katsuragi's stalker who is obsessed with his webnovel, but later becomes his girlfriend. She discovers the clone lab at the same time as Katsuragi. Although she moves away from Tokyo after Katsuragi's death, she later appears to give support to Shou Niikura during the incident at Kyounan High School.

Police Department

The executive officer and detective of the police force. He despises Akumetsu for murdering his chief, though he also despises his former chief for his indifference, and thus made the capture of Akumetsu his obsession. However, as time passes, he is starting to question Akumetsu's motives, as well as those of the city officials, though still refusing to admit it to himself.

Director of Special Investigations of the Tokyo District. Also known as Bloody Mary, because her nose bleeds every time she is in the presence of one or more evil people. She is investigating the Akumetsu crimes, which are targeting the very same group of high-ranking corrupt officials, that she herself could not prosecute.

Director of the Kanayama Prefectural Police Department and Yamada's former superior. He is Akumetsu's second victim. Unlike the justice-driven Yamada, Masashi only cared to earn career points for traffic violations and minor crimes, while allowing a vicious street gang called Blossom to roam free, and ignoring the pleas from the citizens. Akumetsu forces him and the police to perform their duties as law officers by taking Masashi as an hostage and, under threat, force his men to perform their duties in stopping the bikers. He had his left hand's fingers blown off first, then his head destroyed by a point-blank shot from Akumetsu.

Victims

Murase is the prime minister of Japan. A weak and indecisive man who believes he is on the highest office of Japan thanks to sheer luck, he was visited by Akumetsu and given a simple, yet chilly ultimatum: since he believed in the Prime Minister's plans, Akumetsu offered him to take upon himself the task of killing all those who he deemed evil, that is, all the corrupt personnel of the Japanese political and economical world. In the meantime, he gave Prime Minister Murase one month to succeed in his restoration plans, or be faced with Akumetsu's wrath and killed himself if he failed ("failing" including also his resignation from his office or lack of will to accomplish his plans, much to his dismay). It was Murase who coined the nickname Akumetsu, because when he first saw Shou with his mask and an intimidating black suit, he called him an akumetsu, a destroyer of evil.  While technically a victim, Murase was not deemed evil by Akumetsu at the end of the month as he was shown to have a completely changed demeanor and attitude.  He was seen in the last chapter being interviewed by an adult Shiina, discussing the past and asking about Shou having chosen to live the life of a vagabond after he deemed himself failing to make any significant changes in the government as Prime Minister

The Main Metropolitan Bank's consultant and Akumetsu's first victim. He was the perverted official whom Shiina had to degrade herself in front of. He was forced to admit to his crimes toward Japan's failing economy, before being killed by Akumetsu with an axe to the head.

Leader of the Cabinet and the Prime Minister's former corrupt rival. He is Akumetsu's third victim. He is shown at the funeral of the aforementioned official. Akumetsu, however, jumped out of the commissioner's coffin, and cross-examined Nakanoshima on national television and delivered his ideals and accusations; including his views on Japan's failing economy. Nakanoshima is, at first, thrown to the special forces bodyguards, until Akumetsu proceeds to break through every one of them (without killing them), despite being shot several times along the way. Akumetsu then takes Nakanoshima with him off a rooftop, and kills him by dragging him in a suicidal jump (performed as a wrestling takedown move).

Former member of the Ex-Ministry of Finance, who had allocated tax funds as if it were his own money. As a result, he had been living in an extravagant mansion on money that wasn't his. Shou set fire to the property, while a fleeing Akumetsu killed Zaizen by ramming a speeding fire engine into him.

A congressman and former police bureaucrat who sought to be elected as Japan's next Prime Minister. However, his past economic crimes, his proposals for new utility projects and roadways, plus his comment to let 'future generations pay for their parents', made him a target for Akumetsu, and for Kuronuma. Tsuruta survived 3 assassination attempts by Kuronuma, but is finally killed on a live talk show, impaled on a specially-made wheelchair, along with the fake Akumetsu.

Congressman, member of the People's Party, and part of the group which pushed for the construction of an unnecessary expressway. He informed Congressman Gamon about the leaked information concerning the deal, then was kidnapped by Akumetsu inside a restroom stall. He was pulled up by way of a hidden fishing line into the ventilation shaft. His dead body was later found and fished out of Tokyo Bay.

A former Chief Secretary and Diet Party member, Gamon had pushed for the building of an unnecessary expressway, and only increased Japan's failing economy, while filling his pockets. He is the only one of Akumetsu's targets who freely admits that he is corrupt, though he defends it by saying that clean politicians don't get anything done. He was forced into a race with Akumetsu to validate the need for such a route, noticing too late that, whether he won or lost, he would have been in trouble: should he have won while driving on the apparently inadequate national highway, then the expressway would have been deemed unnecessary. Otherwise, if he lost then the expressway was indeed necessary, but this also would have given the opportunity to Akumetsu to reach Gamon's estate and retrieve incriminating files to frame him for his wrongdoings. After being fooled by Akumetsu, he died with him as the former crashed his car down a constructed road, with Gamon pinned on the chassis.

Ex-President of the Great Japan Public Corporation. His obsession over building countless roads, while recklessly depleting public funds made him the next target after Gamon. He was kidnapped from his home, and buried alive with an Akumetsu, underneath a section of the useless expressway that was still under construction. Michinaga was severely beaten in the face as his faults were televised, then he and Akumetsu eventually perished as their oxygen ran out. His statement of 'I am the road' became literal, as police were unable to find the construction site he was buried under.

Former Director of the Ministry Health and Welfare's Pharmaceutical Affairs Bureau, as well as Former Board Chairman of a Semi-Government Medicine Facility. His crimes included gross mismanagement of blood constituents, malpractice, and financial monopolizing over pharmaceutical drugs, but mostly, his indifference at the introduction and misuse of Hepatitis C-laced fibrinogen concentrate, which eventually killed, among others, one of Shou's best friends. Horikiri and other forty-two people deemed responsible were ambushed by an analog amount of Akumetsu while driving their cars and, wounded, were transported via fake ambulance to an abandoned hospital, where they were put to death by means of that same infected fibrinogen they distributed. Horikiri himself died after three days of agony.

Another congressman. Former Construction Lobbyist Diet Member, who was in league with the local yakuza and had extensively drained local tax funds for private construction ventures. This congressman's head was decapitated by an Akumetsu at a wedding ceremony of a criminal boss.

Former Diet Party member who was about to start receiving a huge pension, is interviewed at a local sushi bar by a talk show host. His statements over not wanting to upset the pensions of his fellow congressmen OBs, while totally ignoring the plight of the local pension funds, made him a target for Akumetsu. He dies of a heart attack after seeing the severed heads of his fellow OBs paraded in front of him.

Tomisaka
Chief of Pension Management. Guilty of embezzling and mismanaging pension funds of between fifty thousand and nine hundred thousand, which led to a shortage of three trillion in the total pension pool. To save his own life, he points out that the real criminal was Director Onodera of the Ministry of Health and Welfare. Though Akumetsu murders the director, Tomisaka's life is still threatened in a standoff with the police.

Onodera
Director of the Ministry of Health and Welfare. The real cause of the failing pension system, according to Tomisaka. His office is blown apart, and he is forced into a suicidal dive with an Akumetsu to the pavement.

Former Board Chairman of the Pension Welfare Services. Used pension installments in failing investments. Despite losing around $24.5 billion, he still received a retirement package of over $1 million. He was shown being brutally dragged behind a motorcycle-riding Akumetsu on a racetrack, before they both violently crashed into a wall.

Takatoshi Kanada
Former Board Chairman for the Unification of Japan's Social Insurance Agencies. Guilty of using the National and Welfare Ministry's Pension Funds to bolster the Congressman Pensions, yet he received a pension of over $3 million. Dies with an Akumetsu who had stuck several sticks of dynamite into the politician's mouth.

Congressman. Chief opposition to the People's Party Structural Reforms. His political misdeeds included crimes involving postal insurance and deposits. He and several other politicians were thrown out of the Prime Minister's Conference Room, along with an equal number of Akumetsu. All died when they hit the streets below.

Congressman and forerunner opposition to the People's Party Structural Reforms. Guilty of appropriating public funds for projects that do not benefit the general population. He was brutally pummeled to death by an Akumetsu wearing boxing gloves.

References

Akumetsu